CJ & The Satellites is the solo project of C. J. from The Wildhearts.

Biography
C. J. (Chris Jaghdar) (The Wildhearts/ Honeycrack/ The Jellys) began recording demos for his solo project following the 2005 split of The Wildhearts, towards the end of the year, having finally recorded an albums worth of material, he began putting a band together, he was soon joined by guitarist Paul Grant (3 Colours Red/ Bassknives), bassist Lee Wray (Johnny Zhivago/ Zen Motel) and drummer John Solomon (Modern English/ Tiny Monroe), they played their first shows in China supporting Sebastian Bach from Skid Row before signing to Cargo Records on their return and recording their debut album (Thirteen) between London and Birmingham, it was produced by Jason Edwards (Wolfsbane/ Ginger & The Sonic Circus/ God Damn Whores) and was eventually released during summer 2007 followed by handful of small UK tours, plans were eventually put on hold due to commitments with a reformed Wildhearts.

Line up
 C. J. - Vocals/ guitar
 Paul Grant - Guitar/ vocals
 Lee Wray - Bass
 John Solomon - Drums

Discography

Albums
Thirteen (2007)

English rock music groups
English pop music groups